The following lists events that happened during 1822 in Australia.

Incumbents
Monarch - George IV

Governors
Governors of the Australian colonies:
Governor of New South Wales- Major-General Sir Thomas Brisbane
Lieutenant-Governor of Tasmania - Colonel William Sorell

Events
 John Bigge's first report on all aspects of the colonial government, then under the governorship of Lachlan Macquarie, including finances, the church and the judiciary, and the convict system, was published.
 24 December - Reverend Archibald Macarthur, Hobart's first Presbyterian minister arrived in Australia and held his first service on 12 January the following year.

References

 
Australia
Years of the 19th century in Australia